Alex Preston may refer to:
 Alex Preston (author), English author and journalist
 Alex Preston (singer), American singer-songwriter